The Church of Jesus Christ of Latter-day Saints in Finland refers to the Church of Jesus Christ of Latter-day Saints (LDS Church) and its members in Finland.   In 1950, there were 204 members in Finland.  In December of 2021, there were 4,796 members in 29 congregations.

History

Under the tsarist Russian State, the church was unrecognized and members and missionaries had several conflicts with police. Missionaries and converts often suffered covert  
surveillance, arrests, imprisonments, and deportations by police. The first convert from Finland was baptized in Sweden in 1869.  Though not legally recognized at the time, the first missionaries were sent to Finland in late 1875. On May 6, 1876 the first convert, Johanna Berg, was baptized in Vaasa.  The first branch was organized also in Vaasa on November 13, 1876.  In 1917 Finland declared its independence from Russia.

On January 16, 1947 missionaries were assigned to learn the Finnish language.  Later that year on September 1, the Finnish mission was organized with Hary A. Matis, an American with Finnish ancestry, as mission president. In 1948, the Church began microfilming church records and in 1954, the Book of Mormon was translated into Finnish.

On August 2–3, 1976, about 3,000 Latter-day Saints gathered in Helsinki to hear church President Spencer W. Kimball speak in Helsinki and on October 16, 1977 the Helsinki Finland Stake was organized with 3,642 members. 6 years later on April 17, 1983 the Tampere Finland Stake was organized.

Two former missionaries from the Finnish mission have served as US Ambassadors to Finland:
 Mark Evans Austad
 Keith Foote Nyborg

Stakes and Congregations
Finland had 3 stakes as of February 2023.

Helsingin vaarna (Helsinki Finland Stake)
Espoon 1. seurakunta (Espoo 1st Ward)
Espoon 2. seurakunta (Espoo 2nd Ward)
Helsingin 1. seurakunta (Helsinki 1st Ward)
Helsingin 2. seurakunta (Helsinki 2nd Ward)
Helsingin 3. seurakunta (Helsinki 3rd Ward)
Hyvinkään seurakunta (Hyvinkää Ward)
Keravan seurakunta (Kerava Ward)
Kymenlaakson lähetysseurakunta (Kymenlaakso Branch)
Lohjan lähetysseurakunta (Lohja Branch)

Jyväskylän vaarna (Jyväskylä Finland Stake)
Joensuun lähetysseurakunta (Joensuu Branch)
Jyväskylän seurakunta (Jyväskylä Ward)
Kajaanin lähetysseurakunta (Kajaani Branch)
Kemin lähetysseurakunta (Kemi Branch)
Kokkolan lähetysseurakunta (Kokkola Branch)
Kuopion seurakunta (Kuopio Ward)
Lappeenrannan seurakunta (Lappeenranta Ward)
Mikkelin lähetysseurakunta (Mikkeli Branch)
Oulun seurakunta (Oulu Ward)
Pietarsaaren lähetysseurakunta (Pietarsaari Branch)
Rovaniemen lähetysseurakunta (Rovaniemi Branch)
Vaasan seurakunta (Vaasa Ward)

Tampereen vaarna (Tampere Finland Stake)
Hämeenlinnan lähetysseurakunta (Hämeenlinna Branch)
Lahden seurakunta (Lahti Ward)
Porin lähetysseurakunta (Pori Branch)
Rauman seurakunta (Rauma Ward)
Tampereen 1. seurakunta (Tampere 1st Ward)
Tampereen 2. seurakunta (Tampere 2nd Ward)
Turun 1. seurakunta (Turku 1st Ward)
Turun 2. seurakunta (Turku 2nd Ward)

Mission
On January 16, 1947 missionaries were assigned to learn the Finnish language.  Later that year on September 1, the Finnish mission was organized with Hary A. Matis, an American with Finnish ancestry, as mission president.  On June 10, 1970 it was renamed the Finland Mission and on June 20, 1974 it was renamed the Finland Helsinki Mission to adjust to the naming convention of the church for missions.
On July 1, 1990, The Finland Helsinki East Mission was organized to serve members and missionaries in the former Soviet Republics. On January 2, 1992 the mission was renamed Russia Moscow Mission.

Temples
The Helsinki Finland Temple was dedicated on October 22, 2006 by Gordon B. Hinckley.

See also

Religion in Finland

References

External links
 The Church of Jesus Christ of Latter-day Saints (Finland) - Official Site
 ComeUntoChrist.org Latter-day Saints Visitor site

 
Religion in Finland